A boxcar is an enclosed railroad car for carrying general freight.

Boxcar(s) may also refer to:

Music
 Boxcar (band), an Australian synth pop/techno band
 Box Car Racer, a former American punk band
 The Boxcars, an American Bluegrass band
 Boxcar, a 7" vinyl release by Plaid Retina
 "Boxcar", a song by Jawbreaker from 24 Hour Revenge Therapy
 "Boxcar", a song by Neil Young from Chrome Dreams II

Other uses
 Boxcar (game), alternative name of the dice game Dice 10000
 Boxcars (slang), in dice games, a pair of sixes
 Boxcar averager, an electronic test device
 Boxcar Books, a bookstore in Bloomington, Indiana, U.S.
 Boxcar Comics, a webcomic collective
 The Boxcar Children, a series of children's books
 Boxcar function, a mathematical function
 Fairchild C-119 Flying Boxcar, a U.S. military transport aircraft

See also 
 Bockscar, an American aircraft that bombed Nagasaki in 1945